Hippurarctia is a genus of moths in the family Erebidae. The genus was described by Sergius G. Kiriakoff in 1953.

Species
 Hippurarctia cinereoguttata (Strand, 1912)
 Hippurarctia ferrigera (Druce, 1910)
 Hippurarctia judith Kiriakoff, 1959
 Hippurarctia taymansi (Rothschild, 1910)

References

External links

Syntomini
Moth genera